The Examination for the Certificate in Competency in English (ECCE) is a high-intermediate level English language qualification that focuses on Level B2 of the Common European Framework of Reference for Languages (CEFR).

It is developed by CaMLA, a not-for-profit collaboration between the University of Michigan and the University of Cambridge. The exam has been in use since 1994,  but is regularly updated to ensure it reflects current research in language teaching and assessment.

The ECCE is taken by school-aged and adult learners living in countries where the common language is not English. It is used as official documentary evidence of English language competency and it is ranked at B2  level and is accepted by universities, governments and employers all over the world.

The exam has four test sections, which test the four key language skills: listening, reading, writing and speaking.

Test format

The ECCE is a paper-and pencil test, with the following test sections:

The texts and tasks in the exam reflect a range of personal, public, occupational and educational situations that they might encounter in real-life. The topics are designed to be accessible to all ages and test takers do not require specialized knowledge or experience to complete the test.

A new test form is developed each time the exam is administered.

Scoring
Test takers receive a CaMLA Examination Report, which has the following information:
 A score for each section (0–1,000), with a brief description of the test taker's performance
 An overall result (Honors/Pass/Fail), which is calculated by averaging the scores received for each section.

The following scores are needed to achieve a Honors/Pass/Fail result:

Test takers who achieve an overall score of 650 or higher are awarded the ECCE Certificate. Test takers who achieve a score of 840 or higher in all four sections are awarded a Certificate of Competency with Honors. The ECCE Certificate is recognized at the B2 level of the Common European Framework of Reference for Languages (CEFR).

Test takers are given a numeric score for each section of the test so they can see the areas in which they have done well and the areas in which they need to improve.

An ECCE qualification is valid for life. However, language ability changes over time, therefore, organizations are advised to consider a test taker's experience with English since they took the test in addition to their test scores.

Usage

The ECCE is used as official documentary evidence of English language proficiency. It is accepted by universities, governments and employers in many countries around the world, including:
 Albania (e.g. Ministry of Education and Science) 
 Argentina (e.g. Universidad Católica Argentina (UCA))
 Bolivia (e.g. Centro Boliviano Americano Fundación Cultural y Educativa)
 Brazil (e.g. Banco do Brasil)
 Chile (e.g. Universidad Tecnológica de Chile (INACAP))
 Colombia (e.g. Ministry of National Education)
 Finland (e.g. University of Helsinki Erasmus Exchange)
 France (e.g. L’université François-Rabelais de Tours)
 Greece (e.g. Supreme Council for Civil Personnel Selection)
 Iran (e.g. Soroor Language Institute)
 Italy (e.g. Free University of Bozen-Bolzano)
 Jordan (e.g. Princess Sumaya University for Technology)
 Malaysia (e.g. Lincoln University College)
 Mexico (e.g. Mexican Ministry of Education))
 Peru (e.g. University of Lima)
 Romania (e.g. Ministry of Education and Scientific Research)
 Spain (e.g. Universidad Autónoma de Madrid)
 United States (e.g. DeVry University, Keller School of International Management)
 Uruguay (e.g. Instituto de Profesores Artigas (IPA)).

In 2014, the ECCE was used by test takers with 36 different first language backgrounds (the largest being Albanian, Greek, Portuguese and Spanish). It is mainly taken by secondary school-aged learners:

Preparation
Free practice tests, answer keys and student instructions are available on the official website, along with links to other practice materials.

See also
 CaMLA 
 CaMLA English Placement Test (EPT)
 Examination for the Certificate of Proficiency in English (ECPE) 
 MTELP Series 
 Michigan English Language Assessment Battery (MELAB) 
 Michigan English Test (MET) 
 Young Learners Tests of English (YLTE) 
 Cambridge English Language Assessment 
 English as a Foreign or Second Language

References

External links
 Official website 

ESOL
CaMLA assessments
English-language education
English as a second or foreign language
Standardized tests for English language